"Beer on the Table" is a song co-written and recorded by American country music singer Josh Thompson. It was released in July 2009 as his debut single and the first from his debut album Way Out Here. Thompson wrote this song with Ken Johnson and Andi Zack.

Critical reception
Juli Thanki of Engine 145 gave the song a thumbs-up, calling some of the lyrics "cringe-inducing" but also saying that she thought Thompson had a distinctive voice. Similarly, Bobby Peacock of Roughstock said that Thompson has "an everyman quality to his voice that lends it a sense of authenticity."

Chart performance
"Beer on the Table" debuted at number 55 on the U.S. Billboard Hot Country Songs chart dated August 15, 2009, and reached a peak of number 17 in February 2010.

References

2009 debut singles
2009 songs
Josh Thompson (singer) songs
Music videos directed by Wes Edwards
Columbia Nashville Records singles
Songs written by Josh Thompson (singer)
Song recordings produced by Michael Knox (record producer)